Aahuti may refer to:

Aahuti (1950 film)
Aahuti (1977 film), an Ollywood film of 1977
Aahuti (1978 film)
Aahuti (1985 film)
Aahuti (1988 film), a Telugu film of 1988
Aahuti (2000 film), a Bengali film of 2010